Joe Franchino (born August 9, 1976 in Fontana, California) is an American former soccer player.

Youth and college
Franchino played youth club soccer in Alta Loma, CA for such competitive teams as the Aztecs and Arsenal.  His first club team, the Aztecs, won the State Cup Championships the first year the Under-10 age bracket started.  For High School he attended and played soccer at Damien High School in La Verne, California. 

He played college soccer at Cal State Fullerton- where he was coached by Al Mistri in 1994 and 1995, and was named to Soccer America's All-Freshman team. After his sophomore year, Franchino transferred to the University of Washington, where he played in 1996 and 1997.

Career

Professional
Franchino was selected 30th overall in the 1998 MLS College Draft by the Los Angeles Galaxy. After appearing in 16 games and recording four assists as a rookie, Franchino became a consistent starter for the Galaxy in 1999. He played in 25 games in 1999, 16 of them starts, and recorded three assists.  In the middle of the 2000 season, however, the Galaxy were forced by the league to give Franchino to the New England Revolution, along with Clint Mathis to the MetroStars, in exchange for the marquee acquisition of Luis Hernández. While Hernandez was a colossal failure, Franchino became an important part of the Revolution's lineup. He started all 22 games he appeared in for New England in 2000 and played a semi-regular starting role for the next six years, during some of which he was team captain.

On April 18, 2008, Franchino was acquired by the Los Angeles Galaxy in exchange for a second-round pick in the 2009 MLS SuperDraft. On November 26, 2008, the Galaxy waived Franchino.

International
Franchino played one game with the U.S. national team, earning a cap in a friendly against Mexico in October 2000.

References

1976 births
Living people
American soccer players
Cal State Fullerton Titans men's soccer players
American people of Italian descent
LA Galaxy players
Major League Soccer players
MLS Pro-40 players
New England Revolution players
Orange County Blue Star players
A-League (1995–2004) players
United States men's international soccer players
Washington Huskies men's soccer players
LA Galaxy draft picks
Association football midfielders